PTC Punjabi Film Awards are Indian film awards presented annually by the PTC Punjabi television network to honour both artistic and technical excellence of professional filmmakers and actors with achievements in the field of Punjabi cinema in India.

History 
The PTC Punjabi Film awards were first introduced in 2011. In 2020, Digital Film Awards were introduced. In the same year, due to coronavirus pandemic network announced the award show will be held online.

PTC Punjabi Film Awards 2019 

In 2019 the awards were anchored by Sonu Sood, Divya Dutta, Manish Paul, Gavy Chahal and Gurnam Bhullar.They took place at JLPL Ground, Mohali on 16 March. Sajjan Singh Rangroot, Carry On Jatta 2 and Qismat were the top winners winning 4 awards each, followed by Laung Laachi with 3 awards.

PTC Punjabi Film Awards 2020 

The World's first online awards show this year: PTC Punjabi Film Awards 2020. 2020 has not been a great year for the entertainment industry. COVID-19 forced lockdown across the globe and most events have been postponed indefinitely, if not cancelled. PTC Punjabi Film Awards 2020 therefore will go online. PTC Network is using technology to its best to make sure this event does not lack the glitz and glamour that it promises.

Awards 
As of 2014, there are 26 awards. There was a separate category of film-critics awards, decided by noted film-critics rather than popular votes. This dual format has also generated some controversy amongst viewers and recipients. Awards were given in the following categories.

Merit Awards

Best Movie
Best Director
Best Actor
Best Actress 
Best Supporting Actor 
Best Supporting Actress 
Best Performance in a Negative Role 
Best Performance in a Comic Role
Best Debut Director (Introduced in 2013) 
Best Male Debut 
Best Female Debut 
Best Music Director 
Best Lyricist 
Best Male Playback Singer 
Best Female Playback Singer

Critics Awards

Critics Award For Best Movie
Critics Award For Best Performance (Actor)
Critics Award For Best Performance (Actress)
Critics Award For Best Director

Technical Awards

Best Cinematography
Best Editing
Best Story
Best Screenplay & Dialogue
Best Sound Recording
Best Background Music

Special Awards

Lifetime Achievement
Icon of Punjab (2012)

See also
Cinema of India

References

External links
 PTC Punjabi Film Awards Archives of photos of PTC Film awards since the beginning.

Indian film awards
Punjabi-language films
2011 establishments in Punjab, India
Awards established in 2011